= Dwight House =

House in Fulham, London, England

Coordinates: 51.470176°N 0.209347°W

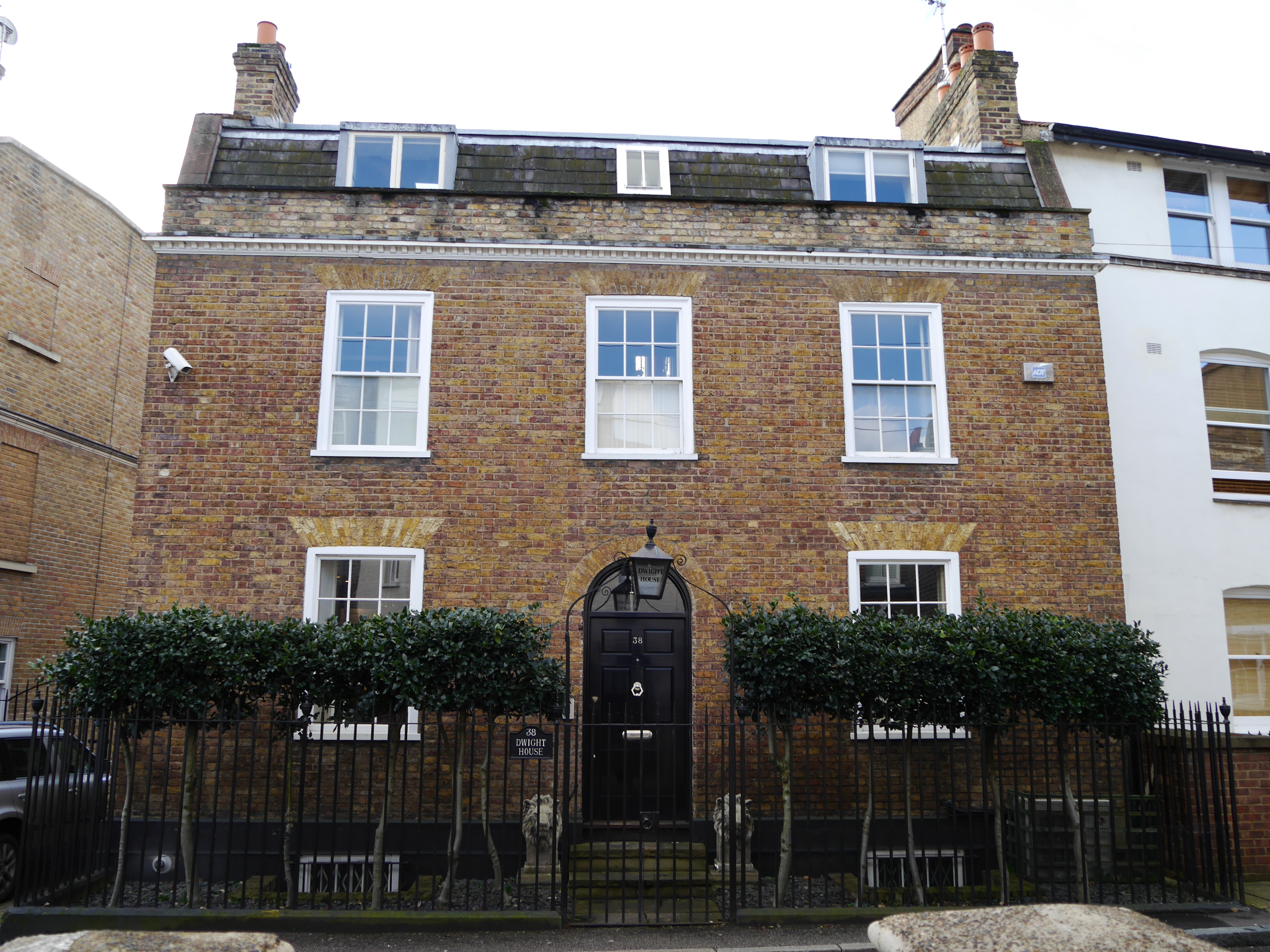
Dwight House

Dwight House is a Grade II listed house at 38 Burlington Road, Fulham, London, built in the late 18th century.
